Cruise Channel was a television channel in the United Kingdom and Ireland. It was launched as Holiday & Cruise Channel on 1 August 2011, on sky TV in the UK & Ireland. It was the first TV channel in the world to feature just holidays & cruises, with new programmes everyday featuring cruise holiday offers.

The channel was also simulcast each day at selected times on Channel 5 +24 on Freeview & Virgin Media but that ended when Channel 5 was taken over by Viacom.

In August 2016, the channel was re-branded as Holiday & Cruise TV. The Channel closed on 4 September 2018.

The main presenters included John Cooper, Richard Cross, Carly Nickson & Dom Tolley most of whom work also for 'Vision Cruise' a cruise only travel agency based in Liverpool, UK, with offices also in Australia & USA.

On 6 September 2018, the channel was re-branded as Cruise Channel.

References

 Vision Cruise on Holiday & Cruise TV

External links
Holiday & Cruise TV
Holiday & Cruise TV - John Cooper
Holiday & Cruise TV - Richard Cross 
Holiday & Cruise TV - Carly Nickson

Travel television